May Sutton won the singles tennis title of the 1904 U.S. Women's National Singles Championship by defeating reigning champion Elisabeth Moore 6–1, 6–2 in the challenge round. Sutton had won the right to challenge Moore by defeating Helen Homans 6–1, 6–1 in the final of the All Comers' competition. The event was played on outdoor grass courts and held at the Philadelphia Cricket Club in Wissahickon Heights, Chestnut Hill, Philadelphia from June 21 through June 25, 1904.

Draw

Challenge round

All Comers' finals

References

1904
1904 in American women's sports
June 1904 sports events
Women's Singles
1904 in women's tennis
Chestnut Hill, Philadelphia
1900s in Philadelphia
1904 in sports in Pennsylvania
Women's sports in Pennsylvania